The 12715 / 12716 Sachkhand Express is Superfast train operated by Indian Railways on a daily basis between the cities of Huzur Sahib Nanded in Maharashtra to Amritsar in Punjab. This train  links two famous Sikh shrines. The train is named after Sachkhand Sahib Gurudwara, situated in Nanded.

This train also links New Delhi, which is the capital of India, as well as the state capital of Madhya Pradesh, Bhopal to Nanded, Parbhani, Jalna and Aurangabad of the Marathwada Region of Maharashtra. This train during COVID-19 situation had change the train no. 02715/02716.

Train number

 12715 Sachkhand Express-  -> 
 12716 Sachkhand Express- Amritsar Junction -> Hazur Sahib Nanded

Route & Halts

The train makes stops at the same stations on its reverse journey, except for Hazrat Nizamuddin.

Time-Table
 12715 Sachkhand Express leaves Hazur Sahib Nanded (NED) at 09:30 AM to reach its destination of Amritsar Junction (ASR) at 08:20 PM next day.
 12716 Sachkhand Express leaves Amritsar Junction (ASR) at 04:25 AM and returns to Hazur Sahib Nanded (NED) at 02:10 PM next day.

Coach composition
There are 24 coaches, including 2 -SLR, 3-Second Class, 1-2AC, 5-3AC, 1-pantry, and remaining 12 -Sleeper coaches and 1 -HCP coach.

Train No. 12715 Sachkhand Express now runs with Linke Hofmann Busch (LHB) coaches as of September 27, 2018. 
One rake will be converted to LHB as of September 27, 2018, with revised CC, 12 Sleepers, 4 third ac, 1 2nd AC, PC and 2GS and 2EOG.

Rake position from H S Nanded,

LOCO-EOG-GS-A1-B1-B2-B3-B4-PC-S1-S2-S3-S4-S5-S6-S7-S8-S9-S10-S11-S12-GS-EOG

Traction
The train runs on both diesel and electric tractions. From Hazur Sahib Nanded to Manmad it is hauled by a WDM-3A twins locomotive of Kazipet. From Manmad to Amritsar it is hauled by a Ghaziabad-based WAP-7 locomotive and vice versa.

At the New Delhi Railway station, langar cooked from Veerji da Dera at Tilak Nagar in West Delhi is served in the train. People from Dera distribute the food to all pilgrimages returning from visiting the holy city of the tenth master.

See also
Devagiri Express
Nanded
Aurangabad

References

 

Named passenger trains of India
Rail transport in Maharashtra
Express trains in India
Rail transport in Punjab, India
Rail transport in Telangana
Transport in Amritsar
Transport in Nanded